is a Japanese manga series written and illustrated by Kōji Matsumoto. It was serialized in Kodansha's seinen manga magazine Weekly Young Magazine from 2002 to 2010, with its chapters collected in 33 tankōbon volumes. A second series, Higanjima: Saigo no 47 Nichikan, was serialized in the same magazine from 2010 to 2014; a third series, Higanjima 48 Nichigo… started in 2014.

The series has spawned two live-action films; Higanjima: Escape from Vampire Island, premiered on January 9, 2010, and Higanjima: Deluxe, premiered on October 15, 2016. The first film was licensed for a home video release in North America by Funimation. Two television drama adaptations were broadcast in 2013 and 2016, respectively.

Plot
When Akira Miyamoto learns that his older brother, Atsushi, is missing, his family begins to fall apart. The family business fails, and his father becomes an alcoholic. His two parents constantly compare Akira to Atsushi. Worse, Akira has a crush on a girl named Yuki, who already has a boyfriend, his friend Ken.

One day, Akira finds a girl unconscious in front of his house. The girl, Rei Aoyama, shows Akira Atsushi's ID card, claiming that Atsushi is alive. Rei explains that Atsushi is trapped on Higanjima Island, said to be inhabited by vampires. Akira invites his friends to help his brother, under the guise of a vacation to celebrate their graduation.

Upon arrival, vampires attack their boat and capture all of them except Rei. However, Akira escapes with his friends before vampires can drain their blood. On the island, he meets with Atsushi, who explains that the vampires are led by Miyabi, another vampire. Trained by Atsushi, Akira and his friends begin the battle against Miyabi and his vampire army in order to escape the island alive. The Plot of Higanjima 47 days set after the events of the original series has Akira and his allies try to stop the invasion only for the second sequel Higanjima 48 days later showed the vampire invasion succeeded.

Media

Manga
Kodansha collected its chapters in 33 tankōbon volumes, released from April 4, 2003, to December 6, 2010.

A second series, titled , was serialized in Weekly Young Magazine from August 2, 2010, to July 28, 2014. Kodansha collected its chapters in 16 tankōbon volumes, released from January 6, 2011, and September 5, 2014.

A third series, started in Weekly Young Magazine on August 18, 2014. The first volume was published on December 5, 2014. As of January 6, 2023, 37 volumes have been released.

The first series was published in France by Soleil Manga. Taiwanese publisher Tohan translated all the three series into Chinese.

A gag comedy spin-off manga, titled , written and illustrated by Tarō Sasebo was serialized on the YanMaga Web website and the Comic Days app from October 19, 2020, to December 6, 2021.

Film

Cast
 Hideo Ishiguro – Akira
 Dai Watanabe – Atsushi
 Miori Takimoto – Yuki
 Tomohisa Yuge – Ken-chan
 Osamu Adachi – Nishiyama
 Asami Mizukawa – Rei
 Koji Yamamoto – Miyabi

Anime shorts
A short anime adaptation, titled Higanjima X, debuted on YouTube streaming service on October 15, 2016. On January 8, 2017, Multimedia Studio Tetra announced that Tomokazu Seki will voice all of the characters from episode seven through nine.

Television drama
A live-action television adaptation aired between October 24, and December 26, 2013, on MBS, and TBS. Starring Shunya Shiraishi as Akira, other cast members include Ryohei Suzuki, Rio Yamashita, Megumi Sato, Rui Kurihara, Yuya Endo, Shingo Tsurumi, and Yūga Yamato. The series was released on DVD on March 26, 2014. A sequel television series adapting Higanjima: Saigo no 47 Nichikan and featuring the same cast was announced in August 2014.

Video game
A video game adaptation of Higanjima was released in 2005 by Now Production for the PlayStation Portable.

Reception
Mark Schilling of The Japan Times described the vampires as "not the sensitive heartthrobs of Twilight but vicious, ravenous types who revel in terror and torture." The film grossed $1,247,050 in Japan and $22,142 in Taiwan.

References

External links
 

 

2005 video games
2010s exploitation films
2010s Japanese films
Films scored by Hiroyuki Sawano
Funimation
Horror anime and manga
Islands in fiction
Japan-exclusive video games
Japanese supernatural horror films
Japanese vampire films
Kodansha manga
Live-action films based on manga
Mainichi Broadcasting System original programming
Manga adapted into films
Now Production games
PlayStation Portable games
PlayStation Portable-only games
Seinen manga
Supernatural anime and manga
TBS Television (Japan) dramas
Video games based on anime and manga
Video games developed in Japan